Steve Rudic (born 21 January 1976 in Canberra) is an Australian boxer and Jiu-Jitsu practitioner best known for winning the bronze medal at the Commonwealth Games 2006 in the men's super heavyweight division.

A late starter to boxing, Steve was a former basketball player with the Canberra Cannons. He took up the sport at age 26 under the guidance of English born trainer Garry Hamilton and had just 26 fights with 18 wins before the Games. He beat massive Tongan Isekeli Maama but lost his semifinal to Welshman Kevin Evans. Following the Commonwealth Games he lost at the Australian Championships in Brisbane to the younger Daniel Beahan, who thus became the Australia's representative at the 2008 Summer Olympics.

Steven is a black belt in Brazilian jiu-jitsu and has competed locally in Australia and overseas.
He won a silver medal at the Abu Dhabi Pro Gi World Championships held on 22–25 April 2015 in Abu Dhabi. Steven competed in the Master Blue Belt over 95 kg division. He won his first 2 matches and then lost the final to win a silver medal.

Professional boxing record

References

External links
Bio

Heavyweight boxers
1976 births
Living people
Boxers at the 2006 Commonwealth Games
Commonwealth Games bronze medallists for Australia
Sportspeople from Canberra
Australian male boxers
Commonwealth Games medallists in boxing
Canberra Cannons players
ACT Academy of Sport alumni
Medallists at the 2006 Commonwealth Games